Fernando de Albuquerque was the 13th Captain-major of Portuguese Ceylon. Albuquerque was appointed in 1575 under Sebastian of Portugal. He was Captain-major until 1578 and was succeeded by Manuel de Sousa Coutinho.

References

Captain-majors of Ceilão
16th-century Portuguese people